Robert Maskell (May 27, 1940 – April 14, 2021) was a teacher and provincial level politician from Alberta, Canada. He served as a member of the Legislative Assembly of Alberta from 2001 until 2004.

Early life
Maskell earned a Bachelor of Education degree at the University of Alberta. He became a teacher and then a principal at Jasper Place Composite High School and moved on to become the principal at the prestigious Victoria School of Performing and Visual Arts.

Political career
Maskell was elected to the Alberta Legislature in the 2001 Alberta general election. He defeated incumbent Liberal MLA Karen Leibovici to pick up Edmonton-Meadowlark for the Progressive Conservatives. He ran for a second term in office in the 2004 Alberta general election but was defeated by less than a couple hundred votes by Maurice Tougas a candidate for the Liberals.

Maskell tried to regain his seat in the 2012 Alberta general election, losing out to Liberal Leader Raj Sherman by 118 votes. He died in 2021.

References

External links
Legislative Assembly of Alberta Members Listing

Progressive Conservative Association of Alberta MLAs
1940 births
2021 deaths
University of Alberta alumni
21st-century Canadian politicians